The Sebec River is a tributary of the Piscataquis River in Piscataquis County, Maine.

Sebec Lake

Sebec Lake extends westward from its overflow into Sebec River in the northern part of Sebec. The lake extends through the northeast corner of Dover-Foxcroft and covers the southwest corner of Bowerbank Township and the southeast corner of Willimantic. Minor south shore tributaries include Bog Brook and Cotton Brook in Dover-Foxcroft, and Smith Brook, Bennett Brook, Ayer Brook, and Badger Brook in Sebec. Minor north shore tributaries include Mill Brook and Grapevine Stream in Bowerbank Township and the larger Bear Brook flowing  from Barnard Township. The largest tributaries are Wilson Stream and Ship Pond Stream flowing into the northwest corner of the lake in Willimantic.

Wilson Ponds

Wilson Stream originates in Upper Wilson Pond on the western edge of Bowdoin College Grant West. Tributaries North Brook and South Brook flow into the eastern end of Upper Wilson Pond from Mountain Pond and Horseshoe Pond, respectively. The western end of Upper Wilson Pond overflows into the eastern end of Lower Wilson Pond. Lower Wilson Pond is in the eastern part of Greenville. The southern end of Lower Wilson Pond overflows into Wilson Stream. Big Wilson Cliffs and Little Wilson Falls and Gorge are scenic highlights along the Appalachian Trail.

Lake Onawa

Lake Onawa (or Ship Pond) is in the southeastern corner of Elliotville Township. The International Railway of Maine was built along the south shore of Lake Onawa in 1887. One of the highest bridges on the railroad was Ship Pond Viaduct across Ship Pond Stream.

See also
List of rivers of Maine

References

Maine Streamflow Data from the USGS
Maine Watershed Data From Environmental Protection Agency

Tributaries of the Penobscot River
Rivers of Piscataquis County, Maine
Rivers of Maine